Lake Palić is a lake  from Subotica, near the town of Palić, in Serbia.

Geology 
Despite popular belief, Lake Palić is not a remnant of the vast Pannonian Sea which covered this area and completely drained out some 600,000 years ago. It is estimated that both the Palić  and Ludoš lakes originated in the early Holocene, around 10,000 years ago, when the last major changes in the surrounding terrain occurred. Prior to that, since the draining of the sea, the European climate was much colder, with the exchange of the cold and dry and the warm and wet periods. Alternatively, being frozen and defrosted, the rocks crushed under the ice and crumbled into the dust, which formed sand and loess. The winds would then disperse the loess into the valleys of the Danube and Tisza rivers to the southeast. On the wet grounds, the loess became more compact, becoming thinner and claylike. The surrounding dried land became more and more elevated thus creating the depressions which began to collect water. The process was helped with the erosion which was caused by the water flowing into the depressions. Due to the unstable hydrological regime, the lake constantly disappeared and reappeared through history.

The idea that the lake was remnant of the sea was influenced by its geographical location (in the bed of the former sea) and the fact that the water in the lake was salty. It is more likely that both lakes and the nearby river of Körös-ér are remnants of the former rivers which spilled over the Pannonian basin. Surveys showed that the loess layers are younger than the alluvial ones, so the lakes can't be remains of the former Danube's flow as the wind would naturally cover them with sand and loess.

Human history

Popular local legend
The popular local legend of the lake's origin, which also explains the name, says that the shepherd Paul (Pal in Hungarian, Pavle in Serbian) was pasturing his sheep in the area. He had a lamb with the golden fleece but the lamb disappeared one day, and the inconsolable Paul cried so much that his tears flooded the pasture and created the salty lake. The lake was then named Paligo Palus in Latin, Palics in Hungarian or Pavlova bara in Serbian.

Ancient history
The lake was mentioned for the first time in June 1462 when Hungarian king Matthias Corvinus bestowed it to his mother, Queen Mother of Hungary, Erzsébet Szilágyi, as part of the puszta-like Csongrád County. It was mentioned as Palij. In Ottoman inscription from 1580, it was recorded as the village of Palegyhaza in Subotica nahiyah. The writing says the village has 10 houses. and that all pay taxes.

Modern history
The first, small park along the lake was planted in 1841–1842, in the English style. In 1845 the first spa bathroom with wooden baths and an inn were built. Data on the quality of the water originate from 1847 when the first chemical analysis was done. The lake became a spa and the water was used for the soda water production. The mud was considered healing. Hot baths were built in 1852–1854. Hotel Park was built in 1860, followed by the Little Inn at Ženski Strand in 1885, Hotel Jezero in 1903, and Great Terrace with water tower in 1909–1912. All these structures were declared cultural monuments. After the railway reached Palić in 1869, the lake spa complex became accessible to all parts of Hungary. The train station was built in 1887, the road to the lake was cobblestoned in 1894, and the tram line was established in 1897. The "prestige, Swiss style" Split Alley was built c.1900.

The town of Palić is located on the northern shores of the lake, where in time parks and hotels developed. As it wasn't allowed at the time for men and women to bath together, the Muški Štrand (Male beach) was formed on the east, and Ženski Štrand (Female beach) on the west. They are divided by the small promontory, which is named Ljubavni Rt (Love Cape).

From 1886 to 1889, the swampy banks were arranged, and the semi-circular embankment with a promenade along the lake was built. In 1898, the hydrotherapy sanatorium was opened. The present appears of both town and the lake spa were designed in the 1910s by the architects  and Dezső Jakab in Hungarian Secession style. The complex project included urban and communal arrangement of the park, building and restoration of the edifices, arrangement of the shoreline, etc. 

From the late 19th and into most of the 20th century, the cyclic development of the overgrowth followed by the fish kill were common. In 1970 the eutrophication reached its peak and almost all the wildlife in the lake died. In 1971 the lake was dried, the sludge was dredged and removed, the filters were placed, and the lake was refilled in 1976, but in the next decades, the lake got polluted again. After World War II, a settlement made of weekend-houses developed on the eastern shore, south of Muški Štrand. Many houses were built by the state-owned companies which collapsed since the 1990s, so they were left unattended. Known simply as Vikend-Naselje (Weekend-Settlement), it had 312 houses in 2022.

In 1936, the Palić weather station became operational. Located at the northeast corner of the lake, it measured the highest temperature on 15 August 1952, and the lowest on 16 February 1954. The weather station was destroyed in 1999, during the NATO bombing of Yugoslavia, so the new one was built, a bit further to the east.

Olympic games
Along the lake, the “first modern Olympic games” were held on 26 August 1880, sixteen years before the 1896 Summer Olympics, the first modern Olympics. The games included fencing, running, stone throwing, wrestling and bicycle riding around the lake, which became a traditional event. The games were organized by  Lajoš Vermeš, a school friend and a roommate of Pierre de Coubertin, the founder of modern Olympism. Named the "Palić Olympics", the games became international in 1884 when first athletes from Serbia participated, as the lake was part of Austria Hungary at the time.

He also constructed and paved the bicycle racing track. Investing his own money, Vermeš went bankrupt, and the games were discontinued with the outbreak of the World War I in 1914. Đuro Stantić, who participated in the Palić games, later won a gold medal at 1906 Intercalated Games which were considered a "proper Olympics" at the time.

Wildlife 
Over 200 bird species live in the protected section of the lake. During the emptying and refilling of the lake in the 1970s, artificial island made of the dried sludge were formed. They became known as the birds' islands and are today the only nesting location of black-headed gull in Serbia. Surrounding shrubs are habitats of some of the most endangered birds in Serbia, like the migrating pygmy cormorant and razorbill. There are also the usual inhabitants like ducks, swans and herons.

Preservation

Legal protection 

The lake and the surrounding area are placed under the protection as the Nature Park Palić. The newly formed green belt along the lake was added, while the protection was stripped of the lots in the urbanized touristic zone, where numerous new structures were planned. New addition also includes part of the lake's shoreline, arranged green areas in the central spa area, so as some specific old trees in the park.

The ecological situation in the lake began to sharply deteriorate in the early 2010s. Only in 2015 a spatial plan was finished, which included the area between the lakes Palić and the neighboring Krvavo Lake, which is divided from Palić by a small embankment. The covered area includes  on which the lots were enlarged in an effort to make it easier for the construction of the future complex (closed and opened swimming pools, aqua park, hotel complex, etc.) All previous plans also include the revitalization of the Palić Spa. Works on improving the lake area include: removal of all sources which pollute the lake with nitrogen and phosphorus, which effectively kills the lake; construction of the sewage system around the lake; creation of the protective  buffer zone which would prevent the nutrients from the arable land in the vicinity to reach the lake; replacement of the fish species in the lake; tightened regime of the purifying sewage water from Subotica, which still empties into the lake. Some of the experimental works on a small section of the lake which is not opened for tourists showed some success, but as of 2017 everything is still just at the planning stage. Expropriation of the surrounding land is expected to be finished by the end of 2017 which would allow the formation of the buffer zone and the sewage in the town of Palić was to be done by 2018.

The sand filter apparatus (peskolov, "sand catcher") managed to remove enough phosphate from the water to lower it down to below  while the nitrogen level remained a bit above the allowed quantities even though the purifier removed 70% of nitrogen. Still, the pinky foam formed on the lake several times in the 2017-18 period and the results showed that the quality of the water deteriorated. Experts involved in the process of preservation don't have a definite answer why: a long period of previous pollution, weather conditions, draught, several malfunctions of the filter (January–March and August–September 2017), etc. The 2018 tests showed that the major pollutant of the water are fecal bacteria. It is estimated that it will take at least 5 years for the lake to heal. Measurements in July 2022 showed that the water fits the microbiological criteria, but not the physical-chemical and hydrobiological levels as there were still lots of nitrogen, phosphorus and blue-green algae in the water. The water remained unusable for both drinking and swimming.

2019–2022 revitalization 

In the spring of 2019, it was decided to fish out the Prussian carp, omnivorous and voracious fish, which became abundant in the lake. In several months, over 20 tons of Prussian carp were fished. After the project was done, results showed the first improvement in the quality of the lake water since 1998. Though still categorized as the lowest, fifth category and not suitable for swimming, the water had less ammoniacal and nitrite compounds, and less algae while zooplankton Daphnia,  which feeds on phytoplankton, reappeared in the lake. Another problem is the poaching. Apart from the direct damage in reducing number of animals (including the protected European pond turtle), it also affects the natural purification of water. The main catch for the poachers is the zander, which, as a predator, is very important in the lake's food chain. Situation with Prussian carp turned out to be worse than expected: it was estimated that there are 120 tons of this fish in the lake in total, but 190 tons were actually fished out.

Further expropriation needed for the buffer zone was conducted in 2019–2020. The entire surrounding area was already expropriated in 1974, when the lake was emptied. However, the erosion since then eroded the banks, so the privately owned parcels which were further from the lake, are now on its banks. The buffer zone consists of four layers: 1) reed bed, in the water itself, which prevents the erosion of the banks by the waves and forms habitat for the birds; 2) bank slopes, inhabited by the herbaceous plants and habitat for the reptiles; 3) grassy areas, used only by those who administer and watch the protected areas; 4) pedestrian and bicycle path, with benches and stops where possible. In order to create the buffer zone, a monoculture of wild blackberry shrubs which spread all over the lake, had to be eradicated. It was replaced with other plants, mainly alfalfa, which prevent expansion of the invasive herbaceous plants. In February 2020, it was reported that some bird species, previously absent, were spotted at the lake.

This prompted the second phase of the biomanipulation of the lake. In December 2021, after 10 years of discontinuation, fish stocking with autochthonous species resumed. Predatory wels catfish was reintroduced first, in order to control the population of invasive Prussian carp. Combined with temporary fish bans, in order to allow for the fish to spawn to greater numbers, and monitoring of the number of fish, future stocking batches will include northern pike, zander, common carp, and later other species. Common reed has also been transplanted in the stocked sections, to provide shelter and spawning areas.

In October 2022, the Serbian-German Prussian carp fishing project "Ekolakus" was officially ended. Over 250 tons were fished out of the lake, though a small population still remained, and it will be fished out intermittently. The fish was used as food for animals in the Palić Zoo. By this time, populations of common carp, common rudd, and zander grew significantly. Pike and zander spread via Krvavo Lake and canals into the Ludaš Lake and further into the channeled Körös-ér river. Restocking of the lake with carp and catfish continued, while disturbed stocking marking prevented restocking with rudd and tench.

The "Ekolakus" project, however, continued till the end of 2022, when the report for the 2019–2022 period was published. Water was upgraded two classes up, from the V to the III category, which makes it acceptable for recreation. Water in sector I, where purified water is poured into the lake, overtook the water from the touristic sector IV in quality. Waste from 1,500 houses and 1,000 individual septic tanks was directly poured into the Palić-Ludаš canal in 2019. Since then, 682 houses were connected to the Subotica's sewage system, while the wastewater from the canal is conducted into the water treatment facility. Instead of expected 50 tons of Prussian carp, a total of 273 tons were fished out of the lake. Still, the report concluded that, despite the progress, it is not realistic to expect that Lake Palić will soon become a clearwater lake, without risk for the swimmers.

Tourism 

On 31 May 1950, a small zoo with only three animals (bear, monkey and parrot) was opened above the northwest corner of the lake. It is known for the wast animal spaces, surrounded by an arboretum with 320 plant species and a nursery garden. Core of the park are several oak trees, planted in the 1710s. The zoo has over 150,000 visitors yearly.

Lake Palić has a relatively short summer season. Influenced by the Hungarian border wellness and spa centers which operate the entire year (Mórahalom, Szeged, Makó, Gyula), the idea of building a wellness complex with the spa was launched in 2006. Master plan for Palić was made in 2007 and the revitalization plan in 2014. Construction of the wellness and spa center began on 15 December 2018. The works stalled so in February 2020 the government stepped inn and changed the contractor giving it deadline of 8 months to finish the works. Despite claims of the local tourist organization that number of tourists grew, the corresponding minister Rasim Ljajić said that the government had to intervene since out of the 18 priority tourist destinations declared by the government, Palić is the only one where number of visitors decreased.

Main points of interest, mostly along the northern shore where the town of Palić reaches the lake, include the 19th century Hotel Park, surrounding park made of plane trees planted in the 1910s, former pulmonary sanatorium, luxurious Hotel Jezero, fairy-styled villa Lujza, red-orange castle and the restaurant “Riblja Čarda”, the location of the Vermeš' "Olympic games”. The vicinity of the lake is the location of many vineries, salaš’ adapted for the tourists and the Palić Watertower.

Along the adjoining Krvavo Lake, housing for the participants of the Palić's 1970s Youth work actions was built. In the 1980s the venue housed elementary school pupils and high school students, while in the 1990s it was settled with the refugees from the Yugoslav wars. In 2014, construction of the largest students' resort in Serbia began on this location. The complex also includes sports and conference halls. First visitors were expected in the spring of 2020, but due to the COVID-19 pandemic everything was postponed for March 2021.

As the works on all projects dragged on, local political tensions arose. Local authorities addressed the state government to intervene with the contractors, at the same time announcing construction of the new, luxurious hotel in the same area as the other projects. In June 2022 it was announced that the aqua park will be finished by December 2022, costing almost €14 million in total.

See also 
Ludoš Lake

References

Sources 
 Seleši, Đ. (2006): Voda Ludaškog jezera, JP „Palić-Ludaš“
 Seleši, Đ (2000): Voda Palićkog jezera od 1781. do 1999. godine
 Treitz, P (1903): A Palicsi tó környékének talajismereti leírasa. - Földtani közlöny, 33. K. 316-321

External links 
 Official Lake Palić site

Palic
Geography of Vojvodina
Bačka
Subotica
Palić
Nature parks in Serbia

sv:Palić